Te Mahia railway station is on the Southern Line of the Auckland railway network in New Zealand. It has an island platform layout and is reached by level crossings from Great South Road and Ferguson Street.

In 2013, it was instead discussed that Auckland Transport would potentially close the station, as patronage numbers had not improved significantly. About 1,000 locals opposed the closure option in a petition, and noted that a new residential subdivision was to start construction in the area. Auckland Transport however noted that the planned houses were generally too far away from the station for potential passengers to walk to it.

History  
The station was opened on 16 August 1926. It was renamed from Mahia to Te Mahia from 9 February 1951 by a decision of the New Zealand Geographic Board.

Upgrade 
A multimillion-dollar upgrade to improve access, lighting, security and shelter was underway in August 2018.

Services
Auckland One Rail, on behalf of Auckland Transport, operates suburban services to Britomart, Papakura and Pukekohe via Te Mahia. The typical weekday off-peak timetable is:
3 tph to Britomart, via Penrose and Newmarket
3 tph to Papakura

See also 
 List of Auckland railway stations

References

Rail transport in Auckland
Railway stations in New Zealand
Buildings and structures in Auckland
Railway stations opened in 1926